The Potter Estate is a historic estate at 65-71 Walnut Park in Newton, Massachusetts.  The centerpiece of the estate is a large Second Empire mansion house which was constructed in 1867 by John Potter, Jr., a shoe and leather businessman.  It has a mansard roof characteristic of the style, bracketed eaves, and a single-story wraparound porch that is a later Colonial Revival addition.  The estate includes several outbuildings dating to Potter's time, including a carriage house and gardener's cottage; the estate also has period cast iron fencing.

The estate was added to the National Register of Historic Places in 1986.

See also
 National Register of Historic Places listings in Newton, Massachusetts

References

Houses on the National Register of Historic Places in Newton, Massachusetts
Second Empire architecture in Massachusetts
Houses completed in 1867
1867 establishments in Massachusetts